Crocodile Dundee II is a 1988 action comedy film and the second of the Crocodile Dundee film series. It is a sequel to Crocodile Dundee (1986) and was followed by Crocodile Dundee in Los Angeles (2001). Actors Paul Hogan and Linda Kozlowski reprise their roles as Mick Dundee and Sue Charlton, respectively, here shown opposing a Colombian drug cartel.

The film was directed by John Cornell and shot on location in New York City and Northern Territory, Australia. It cost $14 million to make.

Plot
Mick Dundee and Susan "Sue" Charlton are living happily together in New York. Although Mick's ignorance of city life is a hazard when he attempts to continue his former lifestyle, like blast fishing in Manhattan's waters, Sue's writing has made him a popular public figure. He goes to work for Leroy Brown, a mild-mannered stationery salesman trying to live up to his self-conceived 'bad guy in the streets' image.

While working for the DEA in Colombia, Sue's ex-husband Bob takes photographs of a drug cartel leader's murder of an unknown person, and is spotted by one of the cartel's sentries. He sends the photographs to Sue before being murdered. Colombian cartel leader Luis Rico and his brother and top lieutenant, Miguel, go to New York City to retrieve the photos.

The gangsters take Sue hostage, leading Mick to ask Leroy for help. Leroy contacts a local street gang, whom Mick asks to create a distraction by caterwauling at the mansion's perimeter, leading most of the cartel's guards on a wild goose chase while Mick rescues Sue. Rico goes into hiding to avoid arrest, and after his henchmen fail a subsequent attempt to kill Sue, Mick decides to take Sue to Australia to protect themselves on familiar ground. In Walkabout Creek, Mick is enthusiastically welcomed back by friends. After getting provisions, he and Sue take refuge on his personal land, named Belonga Mick. Here, Sue discovers that Mick legally owns a large plot of land, including a gold mine.

Rico and his men track them to Australia, where they hire some locals to assist, but their Aboriginal tracker abandons them when he hears that their quarry is Mick (the implication being that Mick is a good and respected friend). The gangsters then take Mick's friend Walter as a hostage, but Mick saves his friend by shooting Walter slightly.

Walter convinces the gangsters that Mick's failed attack was because he is the only person suitable to guide them, so they take him as a replacement tracker. He then leads the gangsters on a false trail through the Outback, during which Mick, with the help of his Aboriginal friends he summoned with a bullroarer, reduces the opposition's numbers one by one, leaving the rest increasingly nervous. Mick retrieves Walter from Rico and Miguel, leaving the latter to face him alone.

Rico sets a bushfire in a ploy to corner Mick, but Mick regains the upper hand, captures Rico, and switches clothes with him to lure Miguel into a vulnerable position. Sue, Walter, and Miguel begin shooting at the pair from a distance, mistaking their targets for each other. Walter and Miguel shoot Mick and Rico, respectively, and Rico falls down an escarpment to his death. Sue shoots and kills Miguel, after which they learn of the clothing switch from one of the aborigines. Sue is relieved to find that Walter's shot has only wounded Mick, and the two embrace. He asks her if she is ready to go home, to which she joyfully replies, "I am home."

Cast

 Paul Hogan as Michael J. "Crocodile" Dundee
 Linda Kozlowski as Susan "Sue" Charlton
 John Meillon as Walter Reilly
 Hechter Ubarry as Luis Rico
 Juan Fernández as Miguel
 Charles S. Dutton as Leroy Brown
 Kenneth Welsh as Brannigan
 Stephen Root as DEA Agent
 Dennis Boutsikaris as Bob Tanner
 Ernie Dingo as Charlie
 Steve Rackman as Donk
 Gerry Skilton as Nugget
 Gus Mercurio as Frank
 Susie Essman as Tour Guide
 Colin Quinn as Onlooker at Mansion
 Luis Guzman as Jose
 Alec Wilson as Denning
 Jim Holt as Erskine
 Bill Sandy as Teddy The Aboriginal Tracker
 Alfred Coolwell as Aboriginal
 Tatyana Ali as Park Girl
 Jace Alexander as Rat

Release

Theatrical
The film opened 25 May 1988 in the United States and Canada. In 1987, during the film's production, Paramount outbid the international unit of 20th Century-Fox for the worldwide rights to the film's sequel.

Reception

Box office
Crocodile Dundee II was also a worldwide hit, but not as big as its predecessor.

The film set an opening weekend record in Australia with a gross of A$2,005,536 and went on to gross $24,916,805 in Australia, which is equivalent to $59,890,392 in 2022 dollars.

The film was released theatrically in the United States by Paramount Pictures in May 1988.  For its first six days of American release, its box office receipts of US$29.2 million exceeded those of Rambo III at $21.2 million. It grossed $109,306,210 at the box office in the United States and Canada. It was the second highest-grossing film that year for Paramount (second only to Coming to America) and the sixth highest-grossing film at the United States box office. It also had the biggest opening ever in the United Kingdom with an opening week gross of £2,797,164, including a record opening week gross for a European cinema of £169,139 at the Odeon Leicester Square.

Critical response
Janet Maslin of The New York Times deemed the sequel to be inferior, noting "the novelty has begun to wear thin, even if Mr. Hogan remains generally irresistible". Variety called the film "a disappointing follow-up to the disarmingly charming first feature with Aussie star Paul Hogan. [This] sequel is too slow to constitute an adventure and has too few laughs to be a comedy – resulting in a mildly entertaining 111 minutes that has much less of the freshness and spark that legions of filmgoers loved in the original". Gene Siskel of the Chicago Tribune gave the film two-and-a-half stars out of four and wrote that it "has too much action initially, losing its trademark, gentle touch for the first half of the movie. The film is much more compelling in its concluding scenes in the Australian outback than in its comedy-action scenes in New York City that open the film. The result is that we leave the theater with a bit of a smile, but just a bit. It's not a steady, complete film." On At the Movies, Siskel's co-reviewer Roger Ebert said the film deserves credit for retaining the imagination of the original, in that Dundee continues to defeat adversaries using his wits and survival knowledge rather than turning into a "violent superman" as many action heroes do in sequels, but he nonetheless joined Siskel in giving it "two thumbs down". Kevin Thomas of the Los Angeles Times was generally positive, calling it "almost as much fun the second time around. As an adventure, it's nothing special, yet it's an inspired and good-humored presentation of one of the freshest, most likable screen personalities to emerge in the past decade." Hal Hinson of The Washington Post called the film "about as laid-back a movie as you're ever likely to nap through. The actors take forever to recite their lines, and scenes unfold as if the filmmakers had rented the screen by the month." Hinson added that Cornell "seems not to have understood that for Dundee's heroic laconicism to work, the world around him has to have some energy, it's got to move. But Cornell doesn't know how to create pace or movement. He directs as if he were swinging in a hammock."

On review aggregator Rotten Tomatoes the film has a score of 9% from 32 reviews, with an average rating of 3.60/10. The critics consensus reads, "Retelling its predecessor's same joke with diminishing returns, Crocodile Dundee II sees the franchise's enjoyability go down under." On Metacritic the film has a score of 41% based on reviews from 21 critics, indicating "mixed or average reviews". Audiences polled by CinemaScore gave the film an average grade of "B+" on an A+ to F scale, the same grade as its predecessor.

Then-U.S. President Ronald Reagan viewed this film at Camp David on June 10, 1988.

Sequel
A sequel titled Crocodile Dundee in Los Angeles was released in 2001.

References

External links
 
 
 
 
 Crocodile Dundee II at Oz Movies
 Crocodile Dundee II at the National Film and Sound Archive

Crocodile Dundee
1988 films
Australian comedy films
1980s adventure films
1980s adventure comedy films
Paramount Pictures films
Films about Colombian drug cartels
Films about drugs
Films set in New York City
Films shot in Australia
Films set in the Northern Territory
1980s action comedy films
Films directed by John Cornell
Films scored by Peter Best (composer)
Australian sequel films
Films produced by Jane Scott
1988 directorial debut films
1988 comedy films
1980s English-language films